Ken Kern was a builder and author who devoted himself to aiding owner-builders, and believed strongly in living on the land. He lived outside of North Fork, California at the time of his death and lived for many years on a self-built homestead outside Oakhurst, California

Despite being an experienced builder and proponent of earth sheltering, Kern was killed when an earth roof he designed collapsed on him.

Written works
Writings by Kern include:
 The Owner-Built Home
 The Owner-Built Homestead
 The Owner-Built Pole Frame House
 The Earth Sheltered Owner-Built Home
 The Owner Builder & the Code: Politics of Building
 The Work Book: Personal Politics of Building Your Home
 The Healthy House: An Owner-Builders Guide to Biological Building
 Ken Kern's Homestead Workshop
 Ken Kern's Stone Masonry
 Ken Kern's Masonry Stove
 Fireplaces

References

External links

Construction in the United States